Gary Minihan (born 24 January 1962) is an Australian retired sprinter who specialized in the 400 metres.

At the 1982 Commonwealth Games he won a bronze medal in 400 metres and a silver medal in 4 × 400 metres relay.

He finished fourth with the Australian relay team at the 1984 Summer Olympics. The team, consisting of Bruce Frayne, Darren Clark, Gary Minihan and Rick Mitchell, ran in a new Oceanian record time of 2:59.70 minutes. The record still stands.

He is the son of former St Kilda player Graham "Snowy" Minihan.

References

External links

1962 births
Living people
Australian male sprinters
Athletes (track and field) at the 1982 Commonwealth Games
Athletes (track and field) at the 1984 Summer Olympics
Olympic athletes of Australia
Australian Institute of Sport track and field athletes
Commonwealth Games medallists in athletics
Commonwealth Games silver medallists for Australia
Commonwealth Games bronze medallists for Australia
World Athletics Championships athletes for Australia
Medallists at the 1982 Commonwealth Games